Girraj Singh Dharmesh is an Indian politician from the Bharatiya Janata Party. Dharmesh is a Member of the Uttar Pradesh Legislative Assembly from Agra Cantonment Constituency in Agra district.

He has been appointed Minister of state in a Yogi Adityanath cabinet on 21 August 2019.

References 

Living people
People from Agra
Uttar Pradesh MLAs 2017–2022
Bharatiya Janata Party politicians from Uttar Pradesh
Politicians from Agra
Dr. Bhimrao Ambedkar University alumni
Year of birth missing (living people)
Uttar Pradesh MLAs 2022–2027